Ōya Station is the name of two railway stations in Japan:
 Ōya Station (Nagano)
 Ōya Station (Gifu)